Constellations: Stories of the Future (1980) is a science fiction anthology of short stories edited by Malcolm Edwards and published by Gollancz.

Contents

 Introduction by Malcolm Edwards
 "Light of Other Days" by Bob Shaw (1966)
 "A Pail of Air" by Fritz Leiber (1951)
 "Beyond Lies the Wub" by Philip K. Dick (1952)
 "Let's Go to Golgotha!" by Garry Kilworth (1974)
 "Of Mist, and Grass, and Sand" by Vonda N. McIntyre (1973)
 "Harrison Bergeron" by Kurt Vonnegut, Jr. (1961)
 "Rescue Operation" by Harry Harrison (1964)
 "It's a Good Life" by Jerome Bixby (1953)
 "Mister Da V." by Kit Reed (1962)
 "Billennium" by J. G. Ballard (1961)
 "The Store of the Worlds" by Robert Sheckley (1959)
 "The Wind from the Sun" by Arthur C. Clarke (1964)
 About the Authors (uncredited)

External links

1980 anthologies
Science fiction anthologies